Brad Seymour (born 3 May 1976) is a former Australian rules footballer. A defender from Wagga Wagga, Seymour spent his entire ten-year career with the Sydney Swans and played in the 1996 AFL Grand Final.

External links

1976 births
Living people
Australian rules footballers from New South Wales
Sydney Swans players
Allies State of Origin players